Tatyana Pavlovna Adamovich (born 20 December 1942) is a Russian-born American fencer. She competed in the women's team foil event at the 1972 Summer Olympics.

References

External links
 

1942 births
Living people
American female foil fencers
Olympic fencers of the United States
Fencers at the 1972 Summer Olympics
Sportspeople from Smolensk
Russian emigrants to the United States
21st-century American women